Yangzhou East railway station is a railway station in Guangling District, Yangzhou, Jiangsu, China. It opened with the remaining section of the Lianyungang–Zhenjiang high-speed railway on 11 December 2020.

There are four platforms, in the form of two islands, with an avoiding line in both directions. This is the largest railway station in Yangzhou.

See also
Yangzhou is also served by Yangzhou railway station and Jiangdu railway station on the Nanjing–Qidong railway.

References

Railway stations in Jiangsu
Railway stations in China opened in 2020